Sergei Mikhailovich Pinchuk (born 26 July 1971) is an officer of the Russian Navy. He currently holds the rank of vice-admiral, and is deputy commander in chief of the Black Sea Fleet.

Career
Pinchuk was born on 26 July 1971 in Sevastopol, then part of the Ukrainian SSR, in the Soviet Union. His father, Mikhail Fedorovich Pinchuk, was also a naval officer, who commanded the Kynda-class cruiser Groznyy, and served as the deputy commander of the Baltic Fleet for rear services, reaching the rank of kontr-admiral during his career.

Pinchuk's initial service as an officer was spent with the Baltic Fleet, where from 1993 he commanded the anti-aircraft missile battery aboard the fleet's flagship, the Sovremenny-class destroyer Nastoychivy. Over a period of several years he rose through the ranks, serving as commander of the ship's missile and artillery division, then as senior assistant and finally commanding the ship between 2004 and 2007. During this period he took the navy's higher officer classes, graduating in 1999, and further education at the N. G. Kuznetsov Naval Academy, graduating in 2004. He was chief of staff of the Baltic Fleet's surface forces, based at Baltiysk, and from 2007 he was commander of the 105th brigade of ships, and chief of the Kronstadt garrison.

From December 2010 Pinchuk served as chief of staff and first deputy commander of the Leningrad Naval Base. In February 2014 Pinchuk was promoted to kontr-admiral, and in September 2014 he began studying at the Military Academy of the General Staff of the Armed Forces of Russia.

Pinchuk graduated from the academy in 2016, and was appointed acting commander of the Caspian Flotilla in July that year, being confirmed in his position on 20 September. On 18 February 2021 he was promoted to the rank of vice-admiral. On 9 May 2021 he was appointed deputy commander in chief of the Black Sea Fleet.

In February 2022, Pinchuk was added to the European Union sanctions list for being "responsible for actively supporting and implementing actions and policies that undermine and threaten the territorial integrity, sovereignty and independence of Ukraine as well as the stability or security in Ukraine."

Personal life
Over his career Pinchuk has been awarded various departmental orders and medals, including the Order of Military Merit in 2009. He is married, with a son and daughter.

References 

1971 births
Living people
People from Sevastopol
Soviet Navy personnel
Russian admirals
Recipients of the Order of Military Merit (Russia)
N. G. Kuznetsov Naval Academy alumni
Military Academy of the General Staff of the Armed Forces of Russia alumni
Russian individuals subject to European Union sanctions